was a Japanese racewalker. He competed in the men's 50 kilometres walk at the 1936 Summer Olympics.

References

1908 births
1992 deaths
Athletes (track and field) at the 1936 Summer Olympics
Japanese male racewalkers
Olympic athletes of Japan
Place of birth missing